The 2011 AFL season was the Collingwood Magpies' 115th season in the Australian Football League.

Despite winning the McClelland Trophy and the 2011 pre-season cup, Collingwood lost the Grand Final to premiers 
Geelong.

Collingwood played 22 home and away matches across 24 rounds, with byes in Rounds 7 and 13. The Magpies travelled only four times during the season; one each to Western Australia (to play ), South Australia (to play  again), New South Wales (to play ) and Queensland (to play ).

Squad

 Players are listed by guernsey number, and 2011 statistics are for AFL regular season and finals series matches during the 2011 AFL season only. Career statistics include a player's complete AFL career, which, as a result, means that a player's debut and part or whole of their career statistics may be for another club. Statistics are correct as of the 2011 Grand Final (1 October 2011) and are taken from AFL Tables.

Season Summary

Pre-season

Regular season

Finals

 H ^ Home match.
 A ^ Away match.

Ladder

References

Collingwood
Collingwood Football Club seasons